Hudud (Arabic:  Ḥudūd, also transliterated hadud, hudood; plural of hadd) is an Arabic word meaning "borders, boundaries, limits". In the religion of Islam it refers to punishments that under Islamic law (sharīʿah) are mandated and fixed by God as per Islam. These punishments were applied in pre-modern Islam, and their use in some modern states has been a source of controversy.

Traditional Islamic jurisprudence divides crimes into offenses against God and those against man. The former are seen to violate God's hudud or "boundaries", and they are associated with punishments specified in the Quran and in some cases inferred from hadith. The offenses incurring hudud punishments are zina (unlawful sexual intercourse such as fornication), unfounded accusations of zina, drinking alcohol, highway robbery, and some forms of theft. Jurists have differed as to whether apostasy from Islam and rebellion against a lawful Islamic ruler are hudud crimes.

Hudud punishments range from public lashing to publicly stoning to death, amputation of hands and crucifixion. Hudud crimes cannot be pardoned by the victim or by the state, and the punishments must be carried out in public. These punishments were rarely implemented in practice, however, because the evidentiary standards were often impossibly high. For example, meeting hudud requirements for zina and theft was virtually impossible without a confession in court, which could be invalidated by a retraction. Based on a hadith, jurists stipulated that hudud punishments should be averted by the slightest doubts or ambiguities (shubuhat, sing. shubha).

During the 19th century, Sharia-based criminal laws were replaced by statutes inspired by European models in many parts of the Islamic world, although not in particularly conservative regions such as the Arabian peninsula. The Islamic revival of the late 20th century brought along calls by Islamist movements for full implementation of Sharia. Reinstatement of hudud punishments has had particular symbolic importance for these groups because of their Quranic origin, and their advocates have often disregarded the stringent traditional restrictions on their application. In practice, in the countries where hudud have been incorporated into the legal code under Islamist pressure, they have often been used sparingly or not at all, and their application has varied depending on local political climate. Their use has been a subject of criticism and debate.

Hudud is not the only form of punishment under Sharia. For offenses against man—the other type of crime in Sharia—that involve inflicting bodily harm Islamic law prescribes a retaliatory punishment analogous to the crime (qisas) or monetary compensation (diya); and for other crimes the form of punishment is left to the judge's discretion (ta'zir). Criminals who escaped a hudud punishment could still receive a ta'zir sentence.

In the 21st century, hudud, including amputation of limbs, is part of the legal systems of Brunei, Iran, Nigeria, Saudi Arabia, the United Arab Emirates, and Yemen.

Scriptural basis
Hudud offenses are mentioned in the Quran. The punishments for these offenses are drawn from both the Quran and the Sunnah. The Quran does not define the offenses precisely: their definitions were elaborated in fiqh (Islamic jurisprudence).

Quran
The Qur'an describes several hudud crimes and in some cases sets out punishments. The hudud crime of theft is referred to in Quran verse 5:38:

The crime of "robbery and civil disturbance against Islam" inside a Muslim state is referred to in Quran 5:33:

The crime of illicit consensual sex is referred to in several verses, including Quran 24:2:

The crime of "accusation of illicit sex against chaste women without four witnesses" and a hudud punishment is based on Quran 24:4, 24:6, among others Quranic verse.

Hadiths
The crime of drinking alcohol is referred to in Quranic verse 5:90, and hudud punishment is described in hadiths:

The sahih hadiths, a compilation of sayings, practices and traditions of Muhammad as observed by his companions, are considered by Sunni Muslims to be the most trusted source of Islamic law after the Quran. They extensively describe hudud crimes and punishments. In some cases Islamic scholars have used hadiths to establish hudud punishments, which are not mentioned in the Quran. Thus, stoning as punishment for zina is based on hadiths that narrate episodes where Muhammad and his successors prescribed it. The tendency to use existence of a shubha (lit. doubt, uncertainty) to avoid hudud punishments is based on a hadith that states "avert hadd punishment in case of shubha".

Hudud offences and punishments
The offences subject to hudud punishment:
 Some types of theft (السرقة). Punished with amputation of a hand.
 Highway robbery (hirabah). Punished with death followed by crucifixion, amputation of the right hand and the left foot (the combined right-left double amputation procedure is known as the ancient punishment of "cross-amputation") or banishment. Different punishments are prescribed for different scenarios and there are differences of opinion regarding specifics within and between legal schools.
 Illicit sexual intercourse (zina, الزنا). Includes pre-marital sex and extra-marital sex. Classification of homosexual intercourse as zina differs according to legal school. Lashing is the penalty for offenders who are not muhsan, i.e. they do not meet all of the above criteria. The offenders must have acted of their own free will.
Punished by 80 lashes.
 Drinking alcohol. Punished by 40 to 80 lashes, depending on the legal school.
 Rebellion. Although it is not listed as a hudud offense in most works of fiqh (Islamic jurisprudence), rebellion against a Muslim ruler is considered a hadd offense by some jurists, based on Quran 49:9. There is juristic consensus that the rebels must be exhorted to lay down their arms through a trusted negotiator before loyal troops have a license to fight and kill them.

There are a number of differences in views between the different madhhabs with regard to the punishments appropriate in specific situations and the required process before they are carried out. There are also legal differences (ikhtilaf) over the term limitation of pronouncing the punishment. Hanafite scholars assert that punishment for hadd crimes other than qadhf (false accusation of illegal sex) have to be implemented within a month; except for witnesses with a valid legal justifications for delayed testimony or in cases of self-confession.

Marja' following Shia jurisprudence generally believe that hudud punishments can be changed by appropriately qualified jurists.

Murder, injury and property damage are not hudud crimes in Islamic criminal jurisprudence, and are subsumed under other categories of Islamic penal law, which are:
 Qisas (meaning retaliation, and following the principle of "eye for an eye"), and diyah ("blood money", financial compensation paid to the victim or heirs of a victim in the cases of murder, bodily harm or property damage. Diyyah is an alternative to Qisas for the same class of crimes).
 Ta'zeer – punishment administered at the discretion of the judge.

History
Because the stringent traditional restrictions on application of hudud punishments, they were rarely applied historically. Criminals who escaped hudud punishments could still be sanctioned under the system of tazir, which gave judges and high officials discretionary sentencing powers to punish crimes that did not fall under the categories of hudud and qisas. In practice, since early on in Islamic history, criminal cases were usually handled by ruler-administered courts or local police using procedures that were only loosely related to Sharia. During the 19th century, Sharia-based criminal laws were replaced by statutes inspired by European models nearly everywhere in the Islamic world, except some particularly conservative regions such as the Arabian peninsula.

Under pressure from Islamist movements, recent decades have witnessed re-introduction of hudud punishments and by 2013 about a dozen of the 50 or so Muslim-majority countries had made hudud applicable, many countries have disregarded traditional strict requirements. In 1979 Pakistan instituted the Hudood Ordinances. In July 1980 Iran stoned to death four offenders in Kerman. By the late 1980s, Mauritania and Sudan had "enacted laws to grant courts the power to hand down hadd penalties". During the 1990s Somalia, Yemen, Afghanistan, and northern Nigeria followed suit. In 1994 the Iraqi president Saddam Hussein (who had persecuted and executed many Islamists), issued a decree "ordering that robbers and car thieves should lose their hands". Brunei adopted hudud laws in 2014.

Enforcement of hudud punishments has varied from country to country. In Pakistan and Libya, hudud punishments have not been applied at all because of strict requirements. In Nigeria local courts have passed several stoning sentences for zina, all of which were overturned on appeal and left unenforced because of lack of enough evidence.

During the first two years when Sharia was made state law in Sudan (1983 and 1985), a hudud punishment for theft was inflicted on some criminals, and then discontinued though not repealed. Floggings for moral crimes have been carried out since the codification of Islamic law in Sudan in 1991 and continue. In 2012 a Sudanese court sentenced Intisar Sharif Abdallah, a teenager, to death by stoning in the city of Omdurman under article 146 of Sudan's Criminal Act after charging her with "adultery with a married person". She was held in Omdurman prison with her legs shackled, along with her 5-month-old baby. (She was released on July 3, 2012 after an international outcry.)

The hudud punishment for zinā in cases of consensual sex and the punishment of rape victims who failed to prove the coercion, which has occurred in some countries, have been the subject of a global human rights debate. In Pakistan many rape victims who have failed to prove accusations have been jailed this has been criticized as leading to "hundreds of incidents where a woman subjected to rape, or gang rape, were eventually accused of zināʾ" and incarcerated. Kennedy states that majority of cases against women jailed on charges of zina in Pakistan are filed by their family members against disobedient daughters and estranged wives as harassment suits. Hundreds of women in Afghanistan jails are victims of rape or domestic violence, accused of zina under tazir. In Pakistan, over 200,000 zina cases against women under the Hudood laws were under way at various levels in Pakistan's legal system in 2005. In addition to thousands of women in prison awaiting trial for zina-related charges, rape victims in Pakistan have been reluctant to report rape because they feared being charged with zina. The resulting controversy prompted the law to be amended in 2006, though the amended version has been criticized for continuing to blur the legal distinction between rape and consensual sex.

Crucifixion in Islam, at least in Saudi Arabia, takes the form of displaying beheaded remains of a perpetrator "for a few hours on top of a pole". They are far fewer in number than executions. One case was that of Muhammad Basheer al-Ranally who was executed and crucified on December 7, 2009 for "spreading disorder in the land" by kidnapping, raping and murdering several young boys. ISIS has also reportedly crucified prisoners.

Requirements for conviction

Illegal sex

There are certain standards for proof that must be met in Islamic law for zina punishment to apply. In the Shafii, Hanbali, and Hanafi law schools Rajm (public stoning) or lashing is imposed for religiously prohibited sex only if the crime is proven, either by four male adults witnessing at first hand the actual sexual intercourse at the same time or by self-confession. For the establishment of adultery, four male Muslim witnesses must have seen the act in its most intimate details. Shia Islam allows substitution of one male Muslim with two female Muslims, but requires that at least one of the witnesses be a male. The Sunni Maliki school of law consider pregnancy in an unmarried woman as sufficient evidence of zina, unless there is evidence of rape or compulsion. The punishment can be averted by a number of legal "doubts" (shubuhat), however, such as existence of an invalid marriage contract or possibility that the conception predates a divorce. The majority Maliki opinion theoretically allowed for a pregnancy lasting up to seven years, indicating a concern of the jurists to shield women from the charge of zina and to protect children from the stigma of illegitimacy. These requirements made zina virtually impossible to prove in practice.

If a person alleges zina and fails to provide four consistent Muslim witnesses, or if witnesses provide inconsistent testimonies, they can be sentenced to eighty lashes for unfounded accusation of fornication (qadhf), itself a hadd crime." Rape was traditionally prosecuted under legal categories requiring less stringent evidentiary rules. In Pakistan, the Hudood Ordinances of 1979 subsumed prosecution of rape under the category of zina, making rape extremely difficult to prove and exposing the victims to jail sentences for admitting illicit intercourse. The resulting controversy prompted the law to be amended in 2006, though the amended version is still criticized by some for blurring the legal distinction between rape and consensual sex.

Theft
Malik ibn Anas, the originator of the Maliki judicial school of thought, recorded in The Muwatta of many detailed circumstances under which the punishment of hand cutting should and should not be carried out.
Commenting on the verse in the Quran on theft, Yusuf Ali says that most Islamic jurists believe that "petty thefts are exempt from this punishment" and that "only one hand should be cut off for the first theft." Islamic jurists disagree as to when amputation is mandatory religious punishment. This is a fatwa given by Taqī al-Dīn ʿAlī b. ʿAbd al-Kāfī al-Subkī (d. 756/1356), a senior Shafi scholar and judge from one of the leading scholarly families of Damascus:
The Imam and Shaykh said: It has been agreed upon that the Hadd [punishment] is obligatory for one who has committed theft and [for whom the following conditions apply]:

All of this was said by ʿAlī b. Aḥmad b. Saʿīd (probably Ibn Ḥazm, d. 1064). And the Imam and Shaykh added: and it is also on the condition that [the thief's] confession not precede the testimony and then after it he retracts [his confession]. For if the thief does that first and then direct evidence (bayyina) is provided of his crime and then he retracts his confession, the punishment of amputation is dropped according to the more correct opinion in the Shafi school, because the establishment [of guilt] came by confession not by the direct evidence. So his retraction is accepted.

Efficacy

Amputation
Those arguing in favor of that the hudud punishment of amputation for theft often describe the visceral horror/fear of losing a hand as providing strong deterrence against theft, while at the same time the numerous requirements for its application make it seldom used and thus more humane than other punishments. Supporters include Abdel-Halim Mahmoud, the rector of Azhar from 1973 to 1978, who stated it was not only ordained by God but when implemented by Ibn Saud in Saudi Arabia brought law and order to his land — though amputation was carried out only seven times.
 In his popular book Islam the Misunderstood Religion, Muhammad Qutb asserts that amputation punishment for theft "has been executed only six times throughout a period of four hundred years".

However, according to historian Jonathan A.C. Brown, at least in the mid-1100s in the Iraqi city of Mosul the Muslim jurists found the punishment less than effective. Faced with a crime wave of theft the ulama "begged their new sultan ... to implement harsh punishments" outside of sharia. The hands of arrested thieves were not being cut off because evidentiary standards were so strict, nor were they deterred by the ten lashes (discretionary punishment or tazir) that Shariah courts were limited to by hadith.

Disputes and debates over reform

A number of scholars/reformers have suggested that traditional hudud penalties "may have been suitable for the age in which Muhammad lived" but are no longer, or that "new expression" for "the underlying religious principles and values" of Hudud should be developed. Tariq Ramadan has called for an international moratorium on the punishments of hudud laws until greater scholarly consensus can be reached.

Many contemporary Muslim scholars think that the hudud punishments are not absolute obligations as it is an act of mu'amalah (non-worship), thus, they think that hudud is the maximum punishment.

Hudud punishments have been called incompatible with international norms of human rights and sometimes simple justice. At least one observer (Sadakat Kadri) has complained that the inspiration of faith has not been a guarantee of justice, citing as an example the execution of two dissidents for "waging war against God" (Moharebeh) in the Islamic Republic of Iran—the dissidents waging war by organizing unarmed political protests. The Hudood Ordinance in Pakistan led to the jailing of thousands of women on zina-related charges, were used to file "nuisance or harassment suits against disobedient daughters or estranged wives". The sentencing to death of women in Pakistan, Nigeria, Sudan for zina caused international uproar, being perceived as not only as too harsh, but an "odious" punishment of victims not wrongdoers.

Among the questions critics have raised about the modern application of hudud, include: why, if the seventh-century practice is divine law eternally valid and not to be reformed, have its proponents instituted modern innovations? These include use of general anesthetic for amputation (in Libya, along with instruction to hold off if amputation might "prove dangerous to [the offender's] health"), selective introduction (leaving out crucifixion in Libya and Pakistan), using gunfire to expedite death during stoning (in Pakistan). Another question is why they have been so infrequently applied both historically and recently. There is only one record of a stoning in the entire history of Ottoman Empire, and none at all in Syria during Muslim rule. Modern states that "have so publicly enshrined them over the past few decades have gone to great lengths to avoid their imposition." There was only one amputation apiece in Northern Nigeria and Libya, no stonings in Nigeria. In Pakistan the "country's medical profession collectively refused to supervise amputations throughout the 1980s", and "more than three decades of official Islamization have so far failed to produce a single actual stoning or amputation." (Saudi Arabia is the exception with four stonings and 45 amputations during the 1980s though they were overturned because of lack of required evidence.)

Among two of the leading Islamist movements, the Muslim Brotherhood has taken "a distinctly ambivalent approach" toward hudud penalties with "practical plans to put them into effect ... given a very low priority;" and in Pakistan, Munawar Hasan, then Ameer (leader) of the Jamaat-e-Islami, has stated that "unless and until we get a just society, the question of punishment is just a footnote."

Supporting hudud punishments are Islamic revivalists such as Abul A'la Maududi who writes that in a number of places the Quran "declares that sodomy is such a heinous sin ... that it is the duty of the Islamic State to eradicate this crime and ... punish those who are guilty of it." According to Richard Terrill, hudud punishments are considered claims of God, revealed through Muhammad, and as such immutable, unable to be altered or abolished by people, jurists or parliament.

Opposition to hudud (or at least minimizing of hudud) within the framework of Islam comes in more than one form. Some (such as elements of the MB and JI mentioned above) support making its application wait for the creation of a "just society" where people are not "driven to steal in order to survive." Another follows the Modernist approach calling for hudud and other parts of Sharia to be re-interpreted from the classical form and follow broad guidelines rather than exact all-encompassing prescriptions. Others consider hudud punishments "essentially deterrent in nature" to be applied very, very infrequently.

Others (particularly Quranists) propose excluding ahadith and using only verses in the Quran in formulating Islamic Law, which would exclude stoning (though not amputation, flogging or execution for some crimes). The vast majority of Muslims and most Islamic scholars, however, consider both Quran and sahih hadiths to be a valid source of Sharia, with Quranic verse 33.21, among others, as justification for this belief.

See also
 Islamic criminal jurisprudence
 Cairo Declaration on Human Rights in Islam
 Zia-ul-Haq's Islamization
 Hudood Ordinance

Notes

References

Further reading

Short overviews
 
 
 M. Cherif Bassiouni (1997), "Crimes and the Criminal Process," Arab Law Quarterly, Vol. 12, No. 3 (1997), pp. 269–286 (via JSTOR)

General references

Specific topics
 Zina, Rape and Islamic Law: An Islamic Legal Analysis of the Rape Laws in Pakistan. A Position Paper by KARAMAH: Muslim Women Lawyers for Human Rights
 A. Quraishi (1999), "Her honour: an Islamic critique of the rape provisions in Pakistan's ordinance on zina," Islamic studies, Vol. 38, No. 3, pp. 403–431 (via JSTOR)
 "Punishment in Islamic Law: A Critique of the Hudud Bill of Kelantan, Malaysia," Mohammad Hashim Kamali, Arab Law Quarterly, Vol. 13, No. 3 (1998), pp. 203–234 (via JSTOR)
 "Islamization and Legal Reform in Malaysia: The Hudud Controversy of 1992," Maria Luisa Seda-Poulin, Southeast Asian Affairs (1993), pp. 224–242 (via JSTOR)
 "Criminal Justice under Shari'ah in the 21st Century—An Inter-Cultural View," Michael Bohlander and Mohammad M. Hedayati-Kakhki, Arab Law Quarterly, Vol. 23, No. 4 (2009), pp. 417–436 (via JSTOR)
 "Islamization in Sudan: A Critical Assessment," Carolyn Fluehr-Lobban, Middle East Journal, Vol. 44, No. 4 (Autumn, 1990), pp. 610–623 (via JSTOR)

Islamic criminal jurisprudence
Punishments in religion
Islamic terminology
Islam and capital punishment